Ahmed Atef (born 21 March 1998) was an Egyptian professional footballer who played as a forward for Wadi Degla.

Career statistics

Club

Notes

References

1998 births
Living people
Egyptian footballers
Egyptian expatriate footballers
Association football forwards
Wadi Degla SC players
Ergotelis F.C. players
Super League Greece 2 players
Egyptian expatriate sportspeople in Greece
Expatriate footballers in Greece
Future FC (Egypt) players